John Corner,  (4 January 1916 – 23 July 1996) was a British mathematician and physicist. He is best known for his work on interior ballistics and the British hydrogen bomb programme.

Biography 
John Corner was born in Newcastle upon Tyne, England, on 4 January 1916. He was educated at Newcastle Royal Grammar School, and then entered Peterhouse, Cambridge. He obtained firsts in Parts I and II of the Mathematical Tripos in 1937. He was subsequently awarded his PhD in 1946. After graduation from the University of Cambridge in 1937, he became a lecturer in mathematics at the University of Liverpool.

He joined the Ordnance Board in 1939, and then the Armament Research Department in 1942. There he worked on interior ballistics problems at Fort Halstead with  J. W. Maccoll, with whom he published many papers on the thermodynamics and thermochemistry of guns. He eventually wrote a textbook on the subject, Theory of the Interior Ballistics of Guns, which was published in 1950. In 1945, he married Kathleen Thurston. They had a daughter and a son.

In 1946, William Penney, the Chief Superintendent Armament Research at Fort Halstead, recruited Corner to work on High Explosive Research, the British atomic bomb programme. Corner headed the theoretical group, where he made extensive use of recently-developed computer technology, employing machines purchased from ICL, IBM and Ferranti. In 1950, he was promoted to superintendent, becoming the youngest ever appointee to that grade. The first British atomic bomb was successfully tested in the Operation Hurricane test in Australia in 1952.

Newcastle University offered Corner its chair in theoretical physics in 1953, but he chose instead to move to the Atomic Weapons Research Establishment at Aldermaston, where he worked on the British hydrogen bomb programme. The successful Operation Grapple tests at Christmas Island in 1957 and 1958 paved the way for the resumption of the nuclear Special Relationship with the United States in the form of the 1958 US–UK Mutual Defence Agreement, and Corner was involved in the first exchanges of technical information on nuclear weapons with the United States. For his work on the hydrogen bomb, he was appointed a Commander of the Order of the British Empire in the 1958 Birthday Honours.

Corner retired in 1975. In later life he suffered from Parkinson's disease. He died in Dartmouth, Devon on 23 July 1996.

Notes

Bibliography 
 

1916 births
1996 deaths
Alumni of Peterhouse, Cambridge
Commanders of the Order of the British Empire
English physicists
People associated with the nuclear weapons programme of the United Kingdom
People educated at the Royal Grammar School, Newcastle upon Tyne